Chiang Mai University ( CMU) is a public research university in northern Thailand founded in 1964. It has a strong emphasis on engineering, science, agriculture, and medicine.  Its instructional mission includes undergraduate, graduate, professional and continuing education offered through resident instruction. Its main campus lies between Chiang Mai town and Doi Suthep in Chiang Mai, Chiang Mai Province.

The university was the first institution of higher education in northern Thailand, and the first provincial university in Thailand.

Campuses 

There are 18 housing complexes located on campus for students attending the university. Seventeen of them are on the main campus and one is on the Mae Hea campus

Suan Sak Campus (main campus) 
The main university campus, known as Suan Sak campus or Cherng Doi, lies about five kilometres west of the city center. Set against Doi Suthep, the campus occupies a  site, bounded on three sides by main shopping streets and on the fourth by the Chiang Mai Zoo. The campus includes the university's administrative centre, the science, engineering, humanities, and social science faculties, political science and public administration, law, the graduate school, all of the campus resource facilities and services and major sports facilities. An attractive feature of this campus is the Ang Kaew Reservoir. Constructed to supply water for the university, it is also a recreational area for campus residents and the local community. In the 1960s, the area was still forested. With conservation in mind, university buildings were constructed between the trees, with the result that the campus still retains much of its original setting.

Suan Dok campus 
Near the main campus, and closer to the city, the health sciences complex, the Suan Dok campus, occupies a  site which includes faculties of medicine, associated medical sciences, nursing, dentistry, pharmacy, and Maharaj Nakorn Chiang Mai Hospital, known locally as Suan Dok, the largest teaching hospital in northern Thailand.

Mae Hia campus 
About 5 km south of the main campus, the  Mae Hia (or Mae Hea) campus is home to the faculties of veterinary medicine agro-industry and School of Public Policy. The Energy Research and Development Institute (ERDI), the university center for renewable energy (mainly biogas and biomass), and energy efficiency improvement center, moved from the main campus to the Mae Hia campus in January 2009. This center is a national "biogas center of excellence", emphasizing biogas activities, especially biogas on swine farms.

Si Bua Ban campus 
The university's latest acquisition is the Si Bua Ban campus in Amphoe Mueang Lamphun, Lamphun Province, about 55 kilometres south of Chiang Mai, on a  site close to the Lamphun industrial centre.

Academics 
Chiang Mai University is a large, highly residential, research university, with a majority of enrollment coming from graduate and professional students.

Faculty 

There are 20 faculties and 2 college in three disciplines.

Rankings 

Chiang Mai University ranks third in academics and fifth in research according to the Thailand Office of the Higher Education Commission. Quacquarelli Symonds ranked the university 88th in Asia in 2023. Chiang Mai University Ranking has been going up recently giving it 601-605 place by QS TOP UNIVERSITY RANKINGS in 2023

Research institutes 
 Energy Research and Development Institute-Nakornping (ERDI)
 Research Institute for Health Sciences (RIHES)
 Social Research Institute (SRI)

Non-university schools 
 Language Institute Chiang Mai University (LICMU)
 Chiang Mai University Demonstration School (K-12)
 Chiang Mai University School of Public Policy (CMU-SPP)

Alumni and notable people

Alumni 
 Yingluck Shinawatra, 28th Prime Minister of Thailand
 Chaturon Chaisang, Deputy Prime Minister from 2002–06
 Suthep Thaugsuban, Deputy Prime Minister from 2008–11
 Kasem Wattanachai, Privy Councilor from 2001–Present
 Apirak Kosayothin, 14th Governor of Bangkok
 Sompop Jantraka, Activist
 Suporn Watanyusakul, Reconstructive surgeon
 Samruam Singh, author, scholar, and activist

Lecturers 
 Minfong Ho, writer
 Roger A. Beaver, biologist
 Conrad H. Bergo, chemist
 Phisit Seesuriyachan, Biotechnologist

References

External links

 Chiang Mai University Official website (English)

 
Education in Chiang Mai
Educational institutions established in 1964
Buildings and structures in Chiang Mai
1964 establishments in Thailand
1960s in Chiang Mai